The Poznań Five — Czesław Jóźwiak, Edward Kaźmierski, Edward Klinik, Franciszek Kęsy, and Jarogniew Wojciechowski — were five students of the Salesian Oratory of Saint John Bosco in Poznań who engaged in resistance activities during the Nazi occupation of Poland. They recruited local clergy, gathered intelligence, and distributed underground newspapers. Arrested by the Gestapo in September 1940 for their activities, they were moved around to various prisons before being guillotined in Dresden on 24 August 1942. They are folkheroes in Poznan.

References 

108 Blessed Polish Martyrs
Polish people executed by Nazi Germany
People executed by Nazi Germany by guillotine
Polish resistance members of World War II